George Powell (born 23 December 1955) is a Jamaican cricketer. He played in twenty first-class and thirteen List A matches for the Jamaican cricket team from 1981 to 1988.

See also
 List of Jamaican representative cricketers

References

External links
 

1955 births
Living people
Jamaican cricketers
Jamaica cricketers
People from Mandeville, Jamaica